Jacob "Jake" Horton (died April 10, 1989) was a senior vice-president of Southern Company's Gulf Power Unit, killed when a corporate airplane caught fire and crashed into a Pensacola apartment complex, shortly after takeoff from Pensacola, Florida. Journalist Greg Palast has alleged that Horton was murdered, by the corporation, in order to prevent him from accusing the board of directors of making illegal payments to politicians (1 -- p. 109).

References

 The Best Democracy Money Can Buy by Greg Palast (2002)

1989 deaths
Year of birth missing